Meydan Jiq or Meydanjiq may refer to:
 Meydan Jiq, Malekan
 Meydan Jiq, Sarab